Mars Ravelo's Captain Barbell, or simply Captain Barbell, is a 2003 Filipino superhero film based on the Pinoy Komiks superhero of the same name. Directed by Mac C. Alejandre from a screenplay by RJ Nuevas, it stars Ramon 'Bong' Revilla Jr., Ogie Alcasid, Albert Martinez, Rufa Mae Quinto, and Regine Velasquez. Produced by Premiere Entertainment Productions, the film was released by Viva Films as part of the 29th Metro Manila Film Festival on December 25, 2003, and was the highest-grossing film among the festival's nine entries.

Plot
Enteng is a gym assistant who lives with his mother, Belen, sister Mara and brother, and has a crush on a local schoolteacher named Cielo. One day he encounters a disused barbell that gives him superhuman abilities as Captain Barbell, who later talks to him about his responsibilities and the source of his powers, a meteor which disintegrated into several pieces and has also granted powers to others who used it for evil. The first of them is Utoy, a vagrant who is lynched and dumped next to a meteorite fragment next to a pile of rats who transforms into a mutant called Dagampatay. Wandering around, he dissolves people with his spit and summons rats around him. After an attempt to poison the La Mesa Reservoir, he is defeated by Captain Barbell when he boomerangs his spit back into himself, dissolving him. The second villain is Roselle, a rape victim who was dumped near blocks of ice and gain freezing powers hence the name Freezy. She kills her rapist and goes on a killing spree of men she seduces before being frozen by Captain Barbell when he shields himself using her hands. The main villain is Lagablab, formerly Enteng's father Arnaldo, a fire-breather at a circus who went on the run after killing his employer and getting struck by lightning, gaining pyrokinetic abilities. He is defeated by Captain Barbell when he sends him to outer space.

Cast
Ogie Alcasid and Ramon 'Bong' Revilla Jr. as Enteng / Captain Barbell
Regine Velasquez as Cielo / Darna
Albert Martinez as Arnaldo / Lagablab
Rufa Mae Quinto as Roselle / Freezy
Snooky Serna as Belen
Jeffrey Quizon as Utoy / Dagampatay
Antonio Aquitania as Efren
Sarah Geronimo as Mara
Emilio Garcia as Mr. Tan
Carlo Maceda as Alvin
Bearwin Meily as Lobo
Goyong as Buyot
Mel Kimura as Lilibeth
Tuesday Vargas as Gang
Vanna Garcia as snatcher victim
John Apacible as Gus
Mikel Campos as Mike
PJ Malonzo as Lastikman
Gloria Diaz as Cielo's mom

Production
Rufa Mae Quinto was announced to be one of the villains in early October 2003. Actor Albert Martinez was hospitalized for a few days after accidentally swallowing kerosene during the filming of a fire-spitting scene, which he insisted on doing himself instead of his stunt double.

Release
Captain Barbell was released by Viva Films on December 25, 2003, as an official entry to the 29th Metro Manila Film Festival. Despite the film's box office success, it did not win any award it was nominated for at the festival.

Box office
Captain Barbell was the highest-grossing film among the nine entries of the MMFF, grossing a total of  62,064,626.

References

External links

2003 action films
2000s English-language films
2000s superhero films
Filipino-language films
Films about mice and rats
Philippine action films
Philippine superhero films
Superhero crossover films
Superhero films
Viva Films films